Adam Sollitt (born 22 June 1977) is an English football coach and former professional footballer who is goalkeeping coach of National League North side Alfreton Town.

As a player he was a goalkeeper from 1995 to 2012. He notably played professionally for Barnsley, Northampton Town and Rushden & Diamonds, as well as playing in Non-league football for Gainsborough Trinity, Kettering Town, Scarborough, Morecambe, Worksop Town and Matlock Town.

Playing career
Sollitt was promoted to the first team squad of Barnsley and was the club's third choice goalkeeper from 1995 to 1997. Manager Danny Wilson released him, following the club's promotion to the Premier League. He then signed for non league club Gainsborough Trinity who were searching for a replacement for departed veteran Steve Sherwood. His performances earned him the chance to move up a league and at the end of the season he signed for Conference club Kettering Town where he remained for two seasons.

In July, 2000, Sollitt re-signed as a professional, this time for Northampton Town for a fee of £30,000. In his two-year stay at Town, Sollitt played in 16 games for the club before moving to local rivals Rushden & Diamonds in the summer of 2002.

He went on to play for Scarborough, Morecambe, and Worksop Town before moving back to Gainsborough Trinity in 2006. Sollitt signed for Matlock Town in August 2009. Sollitt announced his retirement in 2011 and departed Matlock in 2012.

Coaching career
Following retirement, Sollitt remained with Matlock Town as their goalkeeping coach before moving to a similar role with Alfreton Town in August 2019.

References

External links

1977 births
Living people
Footballers from Sheffield
English footballers
Association football goalkeepers
Barnsley F.C. players
Gainsborough Trinity F.C. players
Kettering Town F.C. players
Northampton Town F.C. players
Rushden & Diamonds F.C. players
Morecambe F.C. players
Scarborough F.C. players
Worksop Town F.C. players
Matlock Town F.C. players
English Football League players
Northern Premier League players